Richard Roy Beeman (May 6, 1942 – September 6, 2016) was an American historian and biographer specializing in the American Revolution. Born in Seattle, he published multiple books, and was the John Walsh Centennial Professor of History at the University of Pennsylvania. Beeman was the 2003-4 Harold Vyvyan Harmsworth Professor of American History.  He also served as the director of the Philadelphia Center for Early American Studies, on the board of trustees of the National Constitution Center, and as the editor of American Quarterly. He died in his home outside of Philadelphia from complications due to ALS.

Works

Books
The Old Dominion and the New Nation, 1788-1801 (1972)
Patrick Henry: A Biography (1974)
Finalist for the National Book Award for Biography
Beyond Confederation: Origins of the Constitution and American National Identity (1987)
The Evolution of the Southern Backcountry: A Case Study of Lunenburg County, Virginia, 1746-1832 (1989)
The Varieties of Political Experience in Eighteenth-Century America (2004)
The Penguin Guide to the United States Constitution: A Fully Annotated Declaration of Independence, U. S. Constitution and Amendments, and Selections from the Federalist Papers (2010)
Plain, Honest Men: The Making of the American Constitution (2009)
George Washington Book Prize
Literary Award of the Athenaeum of Philadelphia
Our Lives, Our Fortunes, Our Sacred Honor: Americans Choose Independence (2013)

Articles
"Benjamin Franklin and the American Enlightenment", in The Intellectual World of Benjamin Franklin (Dilys P. Winegrad, ed., 1990)
"The Debate Over Ratification in Virginia", Proceedings of the Leon Jaworski Constitutional Institute (American Bar Association, 1993)
"Deference, Republicanism and the Emergence of Popular Politics in Eighteenth Century America", William and Mary Quarterly, 3rd series (1993)
"Republicanism and the First American Party System", in Parties and Politics in American History (L. Sandy Maisel, and William G. Shade, eds., 1994)
"Small Things Remembered: Writing The History of Everyday Life in Early America", American Quarterly, 42 (March 1990)
"The Colonial Period of American History", in the Encyclopædia Britannica, 15th ed.
"The First American Party System", in the Encyclopaedia of Political Parties and Elections in the United States (L. Sandy Maisel, ed., 1991)
"Self-Evident Fictions: Divine Right, Popular Sovereignty, and the Myth of the Constituent Power in the Anglo-American World", University of Texas Law Review, 67 (June 1989)
"The Revolutionary Character of the American Constitution", The Valley Forge Journal, III (1987)
"The Democratic Faith of Patrick Henry", Virginia Magazine of History and Biography, 95 (1987)
"Thomas Jefferson and the American Revolution", in Thomas Jefferson: A Reference Biography (Merrill Petersen, ed., 1986)
"The Political Response to Social Conflict in the Southern Backcountry: A Comparative View of Virginia and the Carolinas During the Revolution", in An Uncivil War: The Southern Backcountry in the American Revolution (Ronald Hoffman and Thad Tate, eds., 1985)
"Cultural Conflict and Social Change in the Revolutionary South: A Case Study of Lunenburg County, Virginia", with Rhys Isaac, Journal of Southern History, XLVI (November 1980)
"The Social Functions of the Law in Colonial America", Reviews in American History, X (1982)()
"A New Era in Female History", Reviews in American History, IX (September 1981)
"Robert Munford and the Political Culture of Frontier Virginia", Journal of American Studies, XII (1978)
"The New Social History and the Search for 'Community' in Early America", American Quarterly, XXIX (1977)
"Social Change and Cultural Conflict in Virginia: Lunenburg County, 1746-1774", William and Mary Quarterly, 3rd series, XXXV (1978)
"The Colonial Frontier", in America's Historylands (Daniel J. Boorstin, ed., 1977)
"Trade and Travel in Post-Revolutionary Virginia: A Diary of an Itinerant Peddler", Virginia Magazine of History and Biography, 84 (1976)
"Labor Forces and Race Relations: A Comparative View of the Colonization of Brazil and Virginia", Political Science Quarterly, LXXVI (1971)
"Unlimited Debate in the Senate: The First Phase", Political Science Quarterly, LXXXIII (1968)

Awards
Fulbright Scholar
 Harmsworth Professorship of American History at Oxford University
National Endowment for the Humanities Senior Fellowship

References

1942 births
2016 deaths
Writers from Seattle
University of Pennsylvania faculty
University of Pennsylvania historian
Harold Vyvyan Harmsworth Professors of American History
Historians from Washington (state)